Omni-Play Horse Racing is a 1989 video game published by SportTime.

Gameplay
Omni-Play Horse Racing is a game in which a horse racing system is featured with 128 horses in its database.

Reception
Johnny L. Wilson reviewed the game for Computer Gaming World, and stated that "Omni-Play Horse Racing is an excellent simulation of the Sport of Kings. The number of variables factored into each race and the entertainment value provided put this product into the 'Winner's Circle"."

Brian Walker reviewed Omni-Play Horse Racing and A Day at the Races for Games International magazine, and gave it a rating of 10 out of 10, and stated that "if stable management is your game then HR just shades it over ADAR."

Reviews
All Game Guide - 1998
Compute's Amiga Resource - Apr, 1990
ACE (Advanced Computer Entertainment) - Sep, 1989
Commodore User - Jan, 1990
Zzap! - Sep, 1990

References

External links
Review in Compute!

1989 video games
Amiga games
Commodore 64 games
DOS games
Horse racing video games
Racing video games
Video games developed in the United States